Wang Tingdong (1923 – December 21, 2010) was a People's Republic of China politician. He was born in Pingding County, Shanxi. He was a delegate to the 7th National People's Congress and 8th National People's Congress.

References

1923 births
2010 deaths
People's Republic of China politicians from Shanxi
Chinese Communist Party politicians from Shanxi
Delegates to the 7th National People's Congress
Delegates to the 8th National People's Congress
Politicians from Yangquan